The following lists events that happened during 1882 in South Africa.

Incumbents
 Governor of the Cape of Good Hope and High Commissioner for Southern Africa: Hercules Robinson.
 Governor of the Colony of Natal: Henry Ernest Gascoyne Bulwer.
 State President of the Orange Free State: Jan Brand.
 State President of the South African Republic: Triumviate of Paul Kruger, Marthinus Wessel Pretorius and Piet Joubert.
 Prime Minister of the Cape of Good Hope: Thomas Charles Scanlen.

Events

May
 9 – Paul Kruger becomes President of the South African Republic.
 28 – Two ships, the Agnes (94 tonne) and the Christina (196 tonne), run ashore at Plettenberg Bay.

July
 26 – The Stellaland Republic is declared, founding Vryburg as capital.

September
 2 – Kimberley becomes the first town in the southern hemisphere to install electric street lighting.
 7 – W.H. Finlay of Cape Town's Royal Observatory is first to record observations of the Great Comet of 1882.
 29 – 229 Norwegians settle at the mouth of the Umzimkulu River, founding Port Shepstone.

November
 21 – The Goshen Republic is established with its capital Rooigrond near Mafeking.

Unknown date
 Zulu king Cetshwayo returns to South Africa.
 In the Cape Colony, the Dutch language is once again admitted as an official language alongside English.

Births
 24 February – Jan Gysbert Hugo Bosman aka Bosman de Ravelli, concert pianist and composer, is born in Piketberg.

Deaths

Railways

Railway lines opened

 15 December – Cape Western – Wynberg to Muizenberg, .

Locomotives
 Three new Cape gauge locomotive types enter service on the Cape Government Railways (CGR):
 Six 2nd Class 4-4-0 Wynberg Tank locomotives on suburban passenger trains out of Cape Town.
 The first of 33   tank-and-tender locomotives with Stephenson valve gear on the mainlines of all three systems.
 The first of 35   tank-and-tender locomotives with Joy valve gear on the mainlines of all three systems.
 Two new  locomotive types enter service on the private Kowie Railway which is under construction from Port Alfred to Grahamstown:
 Two 0-6-0 tank locomotives in goods service.
 Two 4-4-0 tank locomotives in passenger service.

References

 
South Africa
Years in South Africa